No Es lo Mismo (It's Not the Same) is the seventh studio album recorded by Spanish singer-songwriter Alejandro Sanz, It was released by WEA Latina on September 2, 2003 (see 2003 in music). released more than three years after his last album, El Alma al Aire (2000). It was produced with the collaboration of the Cuban musician Lulo Pérez.

Track listing 
 No es lo Mismo – 6:04
 Hoy Llueve, Hoy Duele – 4:52
 He Sido Tan Feliz Contigo – 3:52
 Try To Save Your S'ong – 3:42
 Eso – 4:17
 Labana – 5:28
 Sandy a Orilla do Mundo – 3:27
 12 Por 8 – 4:40
 Al Olvido Invito Yo – 4:21
 Regálame la Silla Donde Te Esperé – 4:50
 Lo Diré Bajito – 4:33
 Sí, He Cantado Mal – 0:21

Chart performance

Album

Singles

Personnel 

 Adonaya Agarrado Méndez – Background vocals in "12 Por 8"
 Tomasa Agarrado Méndez – Background vocals in "12 Por 8"
 Manu Araujo – Stylist
 Hammadi Bayard – Saxophone
 Tom Bender – Mixing assistant
 Nancy Berek-Mraz – Recording coordinator
 Miguel Betancourt – Recording coordinator
 Dana Bourke – Recording assistant
 Vinnie Colaiuta – Drums
 Luis Conte – Percussion
 Tomás Cruz – Conga in "Regálame la Silla Donde Te Esperé"
 Niños De Jerez – Background vocals in "12 Por 8"
 Jaume de Laiguana – Art direction, graphic design, photography
 Paco de Lucía – Acoustic guitar in "Regálame la Silla Donde Te Esperé"
 Adrián Fregnac – Assistant engineer
 Carlos González – Background vocals
 GQ – Rap
 Guere – Bass in "Sandy a Orilla do Mundo"
 Mick Guzauski – Mixing in all songs except "Labana"
 Horacio "El Negro" Hernández – Drums
 Anthony Jackson – Bass
 Simon James – Conductor (concertino)
 Daniel Kresco – Assistant engineer
 Rosa Lagarrigue – Executive producer
 Michael Landau – Acoustic guitar, electric guitar
 Bob Ludwig – Mastering
 Ala Madrugada – Background vocals
 Carlos Martin – Trombone

 Delvis Mesa – Piano in "Sandy a Orilla do Mundo"
 Raúl Midón – Background vocals
 Zaida Moreno Ruíz – Background vocals in "12 Por 8"
 María Antonia Nogaredo – Background vocals
 The Northwest Sinfonia – Orchestra, strings
 Wendy Pedersen – Background vocals
 Lena Pérez – Background vocals
 Lulo Pérez – Arranger, background vocals, Flugelhorn, Keyboards, piano, programming, trumpet, producer
 Lulo Pérez – Bass synthesizer in "Try To Save Your S'ong"
 Lulo Pérez – Hammond organ in "Eso"
 Santiago Pérez – Conductor (orchestra)
 José Antonio Rodríguez – Acoustic guitar
 Carlos Rufo – Electric guitar
 Enrique Ruíz Carrasco – Background vocals in "12 Por 8" Alejandro Sanz – Vocals, acoustic guitar, arranger, background vocals, producer
 Alejandro Sanz – Tres in "Labana"
 Rafa Sardina – Engineer
 Rafa Sardina – Flute in "Sandy a Orilla do Mundo"
 Rafa Sardina – Mixing in "Labana"
 Pepo Scherman – Engineer
 Jon Schluckebier – Recording assistant
 Shaw Simmon – Recording assistant
 Rafaela Soto Bermúdez – Background vocals in "12 Por 8"
 Eddie Thomas – Background vocals
 Javier Valverde – Assistant engineer, mixing assistant, background vocals
 Chelo Vázquez – background vocals in "12 Por 8"'
 Irene Vázquez – Background vocals in "12 Por 8"
 Dan Warner – Acoustic guitar, electric guitar, guitar (nylon string)

 Awards 

 Special edition No Es lo Mismo: Edición Especial Gira is the 2004 re-release of the album No Es lo Mismo containing a CD and DVD. The CD contains 5 new tracks and the DVD contains 11 videos.

 Re-release No Es lo Mismo (Edición 2006) is the 2006 re-release of the album No Es lo Mismo'' containing a CD and DVD. The CD contains 15 tracks and the DVD contains 13 videos.

Sales and certifications

See also
 List of best-selling Latin albums

References 

2003 albums
Alejandro Sanz albums
Latin Grammy Award winners for Album of the Year
Warner Music Latina albums
Latin Grammy Award for Best Male Pop Vocal Album
Latin Grammy Award for Best Engineered Album
Grammy Award for Best Latin Pop Album
Spanish-language albums